The Timor roundleaf bat (Hipposideros crumeniferus) is a species of bat in the family Hipposideridae. It is endemic to Indonesia.

Sources

Hipposideros
Bats of Asia
Bats of Indonesia
Bat, Timor roundleaf
Mammals described in 1807
Taxonomy articles created by Polbot